was a Japanese samurai of the Edo period who was a retainer of the Matsudaira clan of Aizu. He served as a karō in the Aizu administration, and fought in the Boshin War. Upon the entry of Imperial Japanese Army forces into the Tsuruga Castle town, he led an effort to halt their advance. Upon defeat, he followed fellow karō Jinbo Kuranosuke into a nearby doctor's house, and committed seppuku.

References

Tsunabuchi Kenjo (1984). Matsudaira Katamori no subete. Tokyo: Shin Jinbutsu Ōraisha.
Nakamura Akihiko (2006). Byakkotai.
Hoshi Ryōichi (2005). Onnatachi no Aizusensō.
https://web.archive.org/web/20071218204343/http://bakumatu.727.net/aidu/aidu-jinbutu-tosa.htm

Samurai
1820 births
1868 deaths
People of the Boshin War
Seppuku from Meiji period to present
Karō
People from Aizu
Aizu-Matsudaira retainers
Suicides by sharp instrument in Japan